The Sony Zeiss Distagon T* FE 35mm F1.4 ZA is a large-aperture, wide-angle full-frame prime lens for the Sony E-mount. It was announced by Sony on March 4, 2015.

Though designed for Sony's full frame E-mount cameras, the lens can be used on Sony's APS-C E-mount camera bodies, with an equivalent full-frame field-of-view of 52.5mm.

Build quality

The lens features a weather resistant plastic exterior with a dedicated aperture ring, focusing ring, and detachable petal-type lens hood. It showcases a minimalist black exterior with a Zeiss badge on the side of the barrel. Given the 35mm lens' fast aperture of F1.4, it excels at low-light photography.

See also
List of Sony E-mount lenses
Sigma 35mm f/1.4 DG HSM Art

References

Camera lenses introduced in 2015
35
35